is a train station on the Osaka Metro Midosuji Line in Sumiyoshi-ku, Osaka, Japan. Abiko is situated on the southern city limits, with the Yamato River separating it from Sakai city. Abiko Station is the nearest stop for Osaka City University. The station name is written in hiragana since 我孫子 is difficult to read in kanji.

Station layout
There are ticket gates and two side platforms with two tracks on the first basement level.

History
Abiko Depot was formerly situated after Abiko Station, but it was closed in 1987 after the line was extended southward to Nakamozu and a new depot at Nakamozu opened at the same time.

References

External links
 http://www.city.osaka.lg.jp/contents/wdu020/sumiyoshi/english/

Railway stations in Osaka Prefecture
Railway stations in Japan opened in 1960
Osaka Metro stations